Meredith Henderson (born November 24, 1983) is a Canadian actress known for playing the title role in The Adventures of Shirley Holmes.

She also had a leading role as wheelchair-using Cleo Bellows in the 2001 children's television series MythQuest opposite Christopher Jacot.

In 2005, she appeared in Shania: A Life in Eight Albums, a biopic of country star Shania Twain, in which she played the lead role. She did all the singing, dancing and guitar playing herself.

Henderson also had a recurring role as the girlfriend of Harris Allan's character Hunter on the critically acclaimed, groundbreaking gay  TV series Queer as Folk.

Her sister is actress Beki Lantos.

Filmography

Producer
 Shut up and deal (2007)

Awards and nominations

References

External links 

1983 births
Living people
20th-century Canadian actresses
21st-century Canadian actresses
Actresses from Ottawa
Canadian child actresses
Canadian film actresses
Canadian television actresses